The Labour Research Department (LRD) is an independent trade union based research organisation, based in London, that provides information to support trade union activity and campaigns.  About 2,000 trade union organisations, including 51 national unions in the UK, representing more than 99% of total Trades Union Congress (TUC) membership, are affiliated.

LRD had its beginnings as the Committee of Inquiry into the Control of Industry, set up by the Fabian Society in 1912. The following year the committee was consolidated as the Fabian Research Department. Its first monthly bulletin was established in 1917, as the Monthly Circular. In 1918 the organisation broadened its membership and changed its name to the Labour Research Department.

Publications
LRD publishes extensively on employment law, including the annual guide Law at Work.  LRD publishes LRD booklets, Labour Research, Workplace Report, Fact Service and Safety Rep.

Full information on LRD's publications is available on their website
 http://www.lrdpublications.org.uk

Payline database
LRD maintains the Payline database of pay and conditions which contains information on pay settlements, pay rates, pensions, maternity, paternity and other terms and conditions.  The database contains information on more than 2000 agreements.
 Payline database

Research
LRD carries out research on collective bargaining, equality, health and safety, union developments, workers participation.
Published research includes

 TUC Equality audit (2012)
 TUC Safety reps Survey (2012)
 Widening the gender gap: a report on women's pay and jobs in Europe (2011)

LRD is a member of the Trade Union related Research Institutes (TURI) network.

See also
List of trade unions
Margot Heinemann
Noreen Branson

External links
Labour Research Department
@LRDunionnews on Twitter
LRD on facebook

Political and economic think tanks based in the United Kingdom

Organisations associated with the Labour Party (UK)
Political research institutes